Barbodes sirang, known locally as the sirang, is a possibly extinct species of cyprinid fish endemic to Lake Lanao in Mindanao, the Philippines.  This species can reach a length of  TL.

References

sirang
Cyprinid fish of Asia
Freshwater fish of the Philippines
Fish described in 1932
Taxonomy articles created by Polbot